Minky is the trading name of Vale Mill (Rochdale) Limited, a company based in Rochdale, Greater Manchester, United Kingdom that produces cleaning material and equipment.

History
Minky is a family owned and run business that was founded in the mid-nineteenth century. In 1987, the company acquired the Relax Ironing Board Company and expanded its product range to include ironing boards and was re-branded as Minky. In 1993, it acquired Besco Baron for its cleaning cloth range.

The company has manufacturing units in Crumpsall, Manchester , one in Shawclough, Rochdale, (ironing boards) and one in Bad Honnef, Germany producing cleaning cloths. The annual turnover of the company in 2012 was £33,771,000.00 and it employed 359 staff.

Products
 Carpet sweepers
 Cleaning cloths
 Cleaning products
 Clothes horses
 Clothes lines
 Dusters
 Ironing boards
 Ironing board accessories
 Mops
 Scouring pads

Royal Warrants
In 1994, the company was granted a Royal Warrant to manufacture and supply laundry and cleaning products to the Queen. A second warrant was granted in 2013 to supply products to the Prince of Wales. A wide range of products is supplied to the Royal Households, including hand made conservation dusting brushes for art and antiques.

References

External links

Manufacturing companies of the United Kingdom
British brands
Companies based in Rochdale
Laundry businesses
British Royal Warrant holders